The Illusion of Safety may refer to:

 The Illusion of Safety (Thrice album), 2002
 The Illusion of Safety (The Hoosiers album), 2010